Gye-dong is a dong (neighbourhood) of Jongno-gu in Seoul, South Korea. It is a legal dong (법정동 ) administered under its administrative dong (행정동 ), Gahoe-dong.

Joongang Bath, Korea's oldest public bathhouse, is situated on the northern end of the main street. It also has an old hardware store and sesame oil shop from the 1970s, as well as eateries and cafes in the same style.

See also 
Administrative divisions of South Korea

References

External links
 Jongno-gu Official site in English
 Status quo of Jongno-gu by administrative dong 
 Gahoe-dong Resident office 
 The origin of Gye-dong's name

Neighbourhoods of Jongno-gu